Dawnay is a singer.

Dawnay may also refer to:

Dawnay baronets
John Dawnay (disambiguation)
Guy Dawnay (disambiguation)
Hugh Dawnay (1932–2012), English polo player and author
Jean Dawnay (1925–2016), British model and actress
Dawnay Day, financial services group